Angelo Esposito (born February 20, 1989) is a Canadian former professional ice hockey player who last played for České Budějovice Motor of the 1st Czech Republic Hockey League. Esposito was drafted in the first round (20th overall) by the Pittsburgh Penguins in the 2007 NHL Entry Draft.

Playing career

QMJHL
Esposito's Quebec Major Junior Hockey League (QMJHL) career started in controversy. He was considered a possible first overall draft choice in the QMJHL, but told all general managers that he intended to play college hockey in the NCAA. As a result, he was passed up by the first ten picks in the QMJHL Draft. Just minutes before the Val-d'Or Foreurs were slated to make their pick, at eleventh overall, the Quebec Remparts announced that they had traded several players and draft choices to get the Foreurs' drafting position and selected Esposito.

Esposito began his QMJHL rookie season, in 2005–06, centring the first line. Esposito scored in his first regular season game on his very first shift against the Rimouski Océanic. By mid-season, Esposito was selected QMJHL Rookie of the Month twice and the Offensive Player of the Week once. He finished his rookie campaign with 98 points, second among QMJHL's rookies, behind Claude Giroux, and was named the league rookie of the year. Along with wingers Mathieu Melanson (86 points) and Alexander Radulov (152 points), the Remparts' first line was the most productive scoring line in the entire league.  Despite losing in the President's Cup final series 4–2 to the Moncton Wildcats, Esposito and the Remparts earned a berth in the 2006 Memorial Cup as runner up to the tournament hosts.

Impressing many in his major junior rookie season, Esposito was touted early as a possible first-overall pick for the 2007 NHL Entry Draft.  He had, in fact, already drawn comparisons to former Remparts star Guy Lafleur.  However, declining offensive production at the junior level – his points total fell from 98 to 79 – led to him eventually being picked twentieth overall by the Pittsburgh Penguins.

On February 26, 2008, the Penguins traded his NHL rights to the Atlanta Thrashers along with Colby Armstrong, Erik Christensen, and a 2008 first-round draft pick in a trade-deadline deal for Marián Hossa and Pascal Dupuis.

Professional
At the conclusion of his 2007–08 season with the Remparts, he made his professional debut with the Chicago Wolves of the American Hockey League (AHL). In the off-season, he was traded in the QMJHL by the Remparts to the Montreal Juniors on June 7, 2008.  After a strong start with the Montreal Juniors, Esposito was named to Team Canada and competed in the U20 World Championships, scoring the game-winning goal against Sweden in the gold medal game. After returning from the World Juniors, Esposito tore his ACL in his right knee, causing him to miss the rest of the season. After only 12 games in the American Hockey League (AHL) with the Chicago wolves in 2009, Esposito re-tore his ACL causing him to require a second knee surgery.

On July 8, 2011, he was traded to the Florida Panthers in exchange for Kenndal McArdle. On January 13, 2012, he was traded to the Dallas Stars for Ondřej Roman. After the 2011–2012 season was over Esposito became an unrestricted free agent.

On July 26, 2012, he signed a one-year contract with Finnish hockey club Pelicans from Lahti. After producing 7 points in 29 games in the 2012–13 season with the Pelicans, Esposito was mutually released from the remainder of his contract and immediately moved to play in Italy with Hockey Milano Rossoblu from Milan on  January 17, 2013.

On July 21, 2014, Esposito returned to North America and signed a one-year contract in the ECHL with the Fort Wayne Komets. After the season opening game of the 2014–15 season with the Komets, Esposito decided to take a hiatus from hockey and Fort Wayne waived and released him from his contract.

After taking a years hiatus from professional hockey, Esposito returned to Italy signing a one-year contract with SG Cortina of the AlpsHL on September 5, 2015. He finished the season with 38 points in 31 games. During the 2016-17 season, Esposito had a 9-game stint with  České Budějovice Motor of the Czech 2nd league before he suffered a concussion while playing with the team. He only scored 1 goal in the 9 games he played with the team and at the end of the season Esposito retired from professional hockey.

International play

Esposito competed for Team Quebec as captain during his QMJHL rookie season in the 2006 World U-17 Hockey Challenge, capturing gold.  Later that year, he also captained Team Canada's under-18 squad at the 2006 Ivan Hlinka Memorial Tournament and won another gold medal.  After three years of being cut from Team Canada's World Junior Championships selection camp, he eventually made the team for the 2009 World Junior Championships in Ottawa.   He scored 4 points in 6 games, including the game-winning goal in the gold medal game, helping Team Canada to its record-tying fifth straight gold medal.

Post–playing career

Real estate investor
Esposito currently works in the Quebec area as a real estate investor and landlord. He first bought property in 2015, but continued to buy more soon after. Esposito currently owns about 40 properties.

Politics

2019 federal election

Esposito was the candidate for the Conservative Party in the riding of Alfred-Pellan for the 2019 Canadian federal election. In the 2019 election, Esposito got 5,917 votes, which gave him 10.90% of the vote.

Electoral record

Personal life
Born in Montreal and raised in Mount Royal, Quebec, Esposito grew up figure skating before beginning to play organized hockey at the age of six.  At ten-years-old, he made the decision between the two sports to focus on hockey.  He attended high school first at Selwyn House School then Shattuck-Saint Mary's in Faribault, Minnesota, following in the footsteps of such NHL stars as Sidney Crosby, Zach Parise and Jonathan Toews.

Despite his last name, famous in hockey circles, Esposito is not related to Hockey Hall of Famers Phil and Tony Esposito. He does, however, have uncles named Phil and Tony, in addition to sharing Phil Esposito's jersey number 7 and February 20 birth date.

Career statistics

Regular season and playoffs

International

Awards
QMJHL
Named Player of the Week for September 26 – October 2, 2005.
Named Rookie of the Month for October and November 2005.
Awarded the Michel Bergeron Trophy (offensive rookie of the year) in 2006
Named to the QMJHL All-Rookie Team in 2006.

References

External links

1989 births
Living people
Canadian expatriate ice hockey players in Italy
Canadian expatriate ice hockey players in Finland
Canadian ice hockey centres
Canadian people of Italian descent
Canadian sportsperson-politicians
Chicago Wolves players
Cincinnati Cyclones (ECHL) players
Fort Wayne Komets players
Ice hockey people from Montreal
Lahti Pelicans players
Montreal Junior Hockey Club players
National Hockey League first-round draft picks
People from Mount Royal, Quebec
Pittsburgh Penguins draft picks
Quebec Remparts players
San Antonio Rampage players
SG Cortina players
Texas Stars players